Main Intelligence Directorate may refer to:

 Main Directorate of Intelligence (Ukraine), the military intelligence service of Ukraine
 GRU, the foreign military intelligence agency of the Russian Armed Forces
 GRU (Soviet Union), the foreign military intelligence agency of the Soviet Army